Matthew Caleb Kleinveldt (born 10 August 1989) is an English-born South African professional cricketer. Though born and bred in England, Kleinveldt rejected an offer to play for Hampshire due to England's new stern sporting visa requirements. He duly moved back to South Africa to start a cricketing career there. Kleinveldt is also cousin of ex-Protea cricketer Rory Kleinveldt.

Domestic career
Though born in England, Kleinveldt made his professional cricketing debuts all in South Africa. A tall, elegant left-handed batsman, Kleinveldt had a respectable first-class debut scoring 41 in the first innings and 13 in the second, against Eastern Province in 2010. He made his debut for the Cape Cobras in early 2012 scoring 9 runs against the Dolphins before being dismissed.

He then made another debut for the Cape Cobras in 2015 in their Four-day Test against the Dolphins where he scored 99 runs.

He was the leading run-scorer in the 2017–18 Sunfoil 3-Day Cup for Western Province, with 446 runs in nine matches. He was also the leading run-scorer for Western Province in the 2018–19 CSA 3-Day Provincial Cup, with 629 runs in eight matches, and the leading run-scorer for Western Province in the 2018–19 CSA Provincial One-Day Challenge, with 426 runs in ten matches.

In April 2021, he was named in Free State's squad, ahead of the 2021–22 cricket season in South Africa.

References

1989 births
Living people
English cricketers
Cricketers from Southampton
English emigrants to South Africa
Cape Cobras cricketers
Western Province cricketers
Free State cricketers